Sungai Rambai is a mukim and town in Jasin District, Malacca, Malaysia. It is next to the border of Johor at Kesang River.

Administration 
Sungai Rambai was made an autonomous subdistrict (daerah kecil) in March 2017 but the autonomy was revoked after the 2018 elections.

Politics 
Sungai Rambai is also a state constituency in the Malacca State Legislative Assembly.

Infrastructures
 Sungai Rambai Aerodrome - General aviation airstrip for light aircraft, such as Cessna 172.
 Sungai Rambai Recreational Park
 Halaman Dewan Rambai d'Istana
 Youth Movement Centre

References

Jasin District
Mukims of Malacca